Clinton Township is one of the twelve townships of Vinton County, Ohio, United States.  The 2010 census found 2,052 people in the township, 879 of whom lived in the village of Hamden.

Geography
Located in the southern part of the township, it borders the following townships:
Elk Township: north
Madison Township: northeast corner
Vinton Township: east
Milton Township, Jackson County: south
Washington Township, Jackson County: southwest
Richland Township: northwest

Hamden, the second-largest village in Vinton County, is located in southwestern Clinton Township.

Name and history
It is one of seven Clinton Townships statewide.

Government
The township is governed by a three-member board of trustees, who are elected in November of odd-numbered years to a four-year term beginning on the following January 1. Two are elected in the year after the presidential election and one is elected in the year before it. There is also an elected township fiscal officer, who serves a four-year term beginning on April 1 of the year after the election, which is held in November of the year before the presidential election. Vacancies in the fiscal officership or on the board of trustees are filled by the remaining trustees.

References

External links
Vinton County Chamber of Commerce 

Townships in Vinton County, Ohio
Townships in Ohio